Elara  is a prograde irregular satellite of Jupiter. It was discovered by Charles Dillon Perrine at Lick Observatory in 1905 in photographs taken with the 36" Crossley reflecting telescope which he had recently rebuilt. It is the eighth-largest moon of Jupiter and is named after Elara, one of Zeus's lovers and the mother of the giant Tityos.

It was sometimes called "Hera" between 1955 and 1975. It has a mean radius of just , thus it is 2% of the size of Europa. However, it is half the size of Himalia, so it is the second-biggest moon in the Himalia group. It might be a captured type C or D asteroid, for it reflects very little light.

Elara belongs to the Himalia group, moons orbiting between 11 and 13 gigametres from Jupiter at an inclination of about 27.5°. Its orbital elements are as of January 2000. They are continuously changing due to solar and planetary perturbations.

Discovery
Elara was discovered by Charles Dillon Perrine of the Lick Observatory on January 6, 1905, the day after the discovery of Himalia, also by Perrine, was announced. However, poor weather conditions delayed the confirmation of the discovery till the 21st of February.

New Horizons encounter
In February and March 2007, the New Horizons spacecraft to Pluto captured Elara in several LORRI images from a distance of five million miles.

See also
 Jupiter's moons in fiction

References

External links
 Elara on 1998-08-15 03:21 UTC(Crédit: OHP/IMCCE/CNRS)
 SkyView 23 47 09 -02 40 46
 HORIZONS Web-Interface, JPL
 Elara: Overview by NASA's Solar System Exploration
 David Jewitt pages
 "Two Irregular Satellites of Jupiter" (Himalia & Elara: Remanzacco Observatory: November 23, 2012)

Himalia group
Moons of Jupiter
Irregular satellites
19050105
Discoveries by Charles D. Perrine
Moons with a prograde orbit